Pan-Indian film is a term related to Indian cinema that originated with Telugu cinema as a mainstream commercial film appealing to audiences across the country with a spread to world markets. The movement gained popularity since 2015, post the success of Baahubali: The Beginning.  The term Pan-Indian film is used for a film that is simultaneously marketed and released in multiple languages – Telugu, Hindi, Tamil, Malayalam and Kannada. Such films make an attempt to appeal to the audiences across the country, cutting across the linguistic and cultural barriers.

Background 

Indian cinema is composed of various language film industries. Films are often remade in other languages, examples being Avvai Shanmughi (1996, Tamil) and Chachi 420 (1997, Hindi). Films are also dubbed into other languages and released with localized titles either on the same release date or at a later date. Films such as Dilwale Dulhania Le Jayenge and Enthiran, were dubbed in other Indian languages and were released along with their original versions.

According to The Times of India, the first pan-Indian film from Kannada cinema is Mahishasura Mardini released in 1959. It was dubbed and released in seven other languages. But, no other film was released in more than four languages, since then.

Since 2010s, dubbing and telecasting of South Indian films (primarily Telugu and Tamil) in Hindi became a regular practice by which films from Telugu cinema and Tamil cinema gained popularity nationwide. Majority of the films were dubbed after few weeks or months of the original version release. Similarly, Hindi films were frequently dubbed in Telugu and Tamil languages, but didn't gain as much popularity as Telugu/Tamil films received, except a few like Dangal (2016), M.S. Dhoni: The Untold Story (2016). Over the time, Kannada and Malayalam films were also being dubbed.

Growth 

In 2015, S. S. Rajamouli's duology of epic action films Baahubali: The Beginning (2015) and Baahubali 2: The Conclusion (2017),  changed the face of Indian cinema. The film was released in various languages across the world. Filmmakers started a new film movement, that is, rather than remaking the same film in various languages, they are dubbing the same film in various languages. Srivatsan S of The Hindu wrote that Telugu cinema has excelled in marketing Pan-Indian films. It primarily employed two strategies – promoting the film outside their home territory and collaborating with other regional stars for more visibility.

Kannada film K.G.F: Chapter 1 (2018) directed by Prashanth Neel also released in five languages, thereby becoming the first major Pan-Indian film from Kannada cinema. Success of other films like 2.0 (2018), Saaho (2019), Sye Raa Narasimha Reddy (2019) made Pan-Indian films widespread to other major Indian film industries. Marakkar: Lion of the Arabian Sea (2021) is the first major Pan-Indian film from Malayalam cinema.

Following the success of the Telugu films Pushpa: The Rise (2021) and RRR (2022), Rahul Devulapalli of The Week identified "Content, marketing, [and] indulgent overseas audience" have led to the rise of pan-Indian films from Telugu cinema.

Pan-Indian films also employ actors from different language industry to increase their visibility and bring a universal appeal. In an interview with Film Companion, filmmaker Karan Johar said: "Pan-India is a phenomenon we cannot diminish or dilute."

Notable films considered to be pan-Indian

Criticism 
In an interview with Deadline Hollywood, actor N. T. Rama Rao Jr. expressed his disapproval for the term: "I hate referring to it as 'pan-Indian', it sounds like a frying pan. We just mean it is a film that can travel into all the Indian languages". Speaking with PTI, Dulquer Salmaan said: "The word pan-India really irks me. I just don't like hearing it. I love that there is so much exchange of talent happening in cinema, it's great, but we are one country. I don't think anyone says pan-America." Prabhas, who played the protagonist of Baahubali series, opined that the industry should make "Indian" films instead of "pan-Indian" films. Actor Siddharth echoed the same. He felt the term pan-Indian was a "very disrespectful word" as its use was limited to non-Hindi films. Writer-actor Adivi Sesh felt that "the word is somewhat abused," and used like a euphemism for dubbed film.

Tracking portal Box Office India stated that the term "pan India" means nothing in Hindi film circuits and it is only Hollywood films that cater to all of India. Bharti Dubey and Hemachandra Ethamukkala of The Times of India stated that the pan-Indian films have mostly been action films and criticised the perceived violence in such films. Writing for The Swaddle, Rohitha Naraharisetty feels pan-Indian films glorify toxic masculinity and the "angry young man" archetype, while suffering from underdeveloped and heavily objectified female characters.

See also 
 Parallel cinema
 Transnational cinema
 World cinema

References 

Movements in cinema
New Wave in cinema
2010s in Indian cinema
2020s in Indian cinema
S. S. Rajamouli
Telugu cinema
Cinema of India